The 1997 Philippine Basketball Association (PBA) Governors' Cup was the third and last conference of the 1997 PBA season. It started on September 20 with a provincial game in Tarlac City and ended on December 14, 1997. The tournament is an Import-laden format, which requires an import or a pure-foreign player for each team.

Format
The following format will be observed for the duration of the conference:
 Double-round robin eliminations; 14 games per team. 
The top two teams will automatically qualify to the semifinals while the next four teams will have a crossover quarterfinal round.
Quarterfinals:
QF1: #3 vs. #6, with #3 having the twice-to-beat advantage
QF2: #4 vs. #5, with #4 having the twice-to-beat advantage
Best-of-five semifinals:
SF1: QF1 vs. #4
SF2: QF2 vs. #3
Third-place playoff: losers of the semifinals
Best-of-seven finals: winners of the semifinals

Elimination round

Team standings

Bracket

Quarterfinals

(3) Sta. Lucia vs. (6) Gordon's Gin

(4) Purefoods vs. (5) Mobiline

Semifinals

(1) San Miguel vs. (4) Purefoods

(2) Alaska vs. (3) Sta. Lucia

Third place playoff

Finals

References

External links
 PBA.ph

Governors' Cup
PBA Governors' Cup